Crataegus crus-galli is a species of hawthorn known by the common names cockspur hawthorn and cockspur thorn. It is native to eastern North America from Ontario to Texas to Florida, and it is widely used in horticulture. It is thought to be the parent, along with Crataegus succulenta, of the tetraploid species Crataegus persimilis.

Description
This is a small tree growing up to about 10 meters tall and 8 meters wide, rounded in form when young and spreading and flattening as it matures. The leaves are 5 to 6 centimeters long, glossy dark green in color and turning gold to red in the fall. The flowers are white and have a scent generally considered unpleasant. The fruits are small pomes that vary in colour, usually a shade of red. Most wild varieties of the tree are heavily armed in sharp thorns several centimeters long.

Cultivation
This species is a popular ornamental tree, especially var. inermis, which lacks thorns. Many other wild forms would be very suitable for landscaping if better known, and yellow-fruited forms exist.

Uses
The fruit is edible and can be made into jelly or crushed to make tea.

Images

See also
 List of hawthorn species with yellow fruit

References

External links
 OSU Ornamental Profile
UCConn Plant Database, copyright Mark Brand

crus-galli
Edible fruits
Plants described in 1753
Taxa named by Carl Linnaeus
Trees of the Southeastern United States